"Three Men, a Woman and a Baby" is an episode of the BBC sitcom Only Fools and Horses. It was the final episode of series 7 and was first broadcast on 3 February 1991. This is the last episode of the last regular series, although Christmas specials were broadcast intermittently until 2003. In this episode, the birth of Del and Raquel's baby is imminent. Damien Trotter appears in the show for the first time in the episode's finale.

Synopsis
Rodney enters the lounge suffering from a hangover, Albert informs him that Raquel is in the late stages of pregnancy, and Del Boy will soon become a father. As Rodney and Albert talk about the baby being either a boy or a girl, Raquel enters, soon followed by Del, who is carrying a large cardboard box with its printing on the side reading "Crowning Glory, wigs of distinction", which he acquired from Mustapha from the Bangladeshi butcher's shop. Del then reminds Rodney that he's taking Cassandra to Hampton Court that afternoon.

In the evening, at the Nag's Head, there is a contest to guess what the name of Del and Raquel's baby will be. Del and Albert enter with plenty of wigs to sell, and Rodney tells them that his day out with Cassandra was humiliating and disastrous, because they argued about which way to go in a garden maze.

Back at the flat, Del is angry, because the wigs he bought from Mustapha are men's wigs. One week later, as Rodney and Albert watch an ecological disaster documentary, Del and Raquel return from having attended an antenatal class about the importance of pregnancy. Later that evening, Del tells Rodney that earlier, he bumped into Stephen, Cassandra's former boss at the bank, and the same person who Rodney punched in "The Jolly Boys' Outing". Del saw Stephen wearing a clip-on ponytail. Raquel enters carrying a baby's name book. The Trotters suggest plenty of names, until Rodney flippantly suggests naming the baby Damien. To his bewilderment, Del and Raquel love the name. Rodney desperately tries to get them to change their mind and name the baby Derek, leading to their baby's full name: Damien Derek Trotter. Uncle Albert points out that would make his initials DDT, but Del and Raquel are content, with Del remarking that "there'll be no flies on him." Just then, Rodney gets a phone call from Cassandra.

Rodney (secretly sporting one of the clip-on ponytails) heads over to his and Cassandra's flat to see his wife, and Cassandra tells her husband that clip-on ponytails are embarrassing. Upon hearing this, Rodney furtively removes his ponytail. Then, Cassandra says that she spoke to her solicitor, who suggested that she and Rodney try to repair their marriage by raising a pet. Rodney doesn't want to raise a dog, since he got bit by a Jack Russell as a child. Cassandra does not want to raise a cat, because she is allergic to fur. As Rodney prepares to leave having given up on reconciliation, Cassandra screams upon seeing the discarded clip-on ponytail, believing it to be a rat. Rodney seizes the opportunity to "save the day" and eventually gets rid of it, impressing Cassandra.

Meanwhile, back at Nelson Mandela House, Del discovers that the men's wigs are falling apart, and Raquel goes into labour. Cassandra and Rodney are informed, and Rodney rushes to the hospital.

At the hospital, Del and Raquel wait in the delivery room, while Rodney and Albert wait in the corridor. A group of hospital staff enter the delivery room, and they and Del help Raquel finally give birth to a boy. Albert and Rodney enter the delivery room to meet Del and Raquel's newborn son, Damien Derek Trotter. Rodney reacts terrified as Damien looks at him (as O Fortuna plays in the background). Del then takes his son, goes to a window, and looks outside into the night sky. Del tells the spirit of his late mother Joan about her first grandchild, and tells Damien that he has a loving family, and that this time next year, they will be millionaires. After the credits, there is a group shot of Del Boy, Rodney, Raquel, Albert, and Damien/ enter Miami Twice part 1

Episode cast

Music
 Hothouse Flowers: "Movies"
 Dusty Springfield: "You Don't Have To Say You Love Me"
 Roxy Music: "Street Life"
 Sinéad O'Connor: "Nothing Compares 2 U"
 Carl Orff: "O Fortuna" from Carmina Burana
 Antonio Vivaldi: "Largo" from Concerto for Lute in D Major, RV 93
 Chris Payne: "Declamation" in VHS/DVD versions

References

External links

1991 British television episodes
Only Fools and Horses (series 7) episodes
Pregnancy-themed television episodes